New Appalachia is a term referring to the San Joaquin Valley of California. The term originated in 2005 when U.S. congressional researchers compared the economically distressed Valley to the traditionally impoverished Appalachia region of the Appalachian Mountains.

Geography

The San Joaquin Valley consists of the southern half of the Central Valley, between the Sacramento-San Joaquin River Delta in the north and the Tehachapi Mountains in the south.

Medical access

Insufficient access to medicine in the United States, in particular prenatal and preventive care, is typified by both rural and inner city communities.  Early and adequate access to prenatal care is important to maternal and child health and is another comparative indicator of community health.  According to the California Department of Health Services, 37% of births in Merced County occurred with no or late prenatal care and the San Joaquin Valley average was 19.5% of births with no or late prenatal care.  By comparison, the California average was 13.6% of births and the national average was 10% of births

Likewise, the counties of the San Joaquin Valley have relatively high ratios of population to physicians, suggesting relatively low access, with the highest in Kings County at 1,027 patients per a physician, the San Joaquin Valley average at approximately 671 patients per a physician and the California average of 400 patients per a physician.  Another measure of access is licensed acute care hospital beds per thousand population, where the Kings County average of 1.1 beds per a thousand and the San Joaquin Valley average of 1.8 beds per a thousand were again less than the state average of 2.1 bed per a thousand.  Consequently the age adjusted death rate is significantly higher than the rest of California.

Poverty
Moreover the poverty rate for persons under the age of 18 was as high as 32% in Tulare County and 25.6% in the San Joaquin Valley, compared to 19% in California as a whole.

Quality of life
In 2011 Forbes, after taking the fluctuation of median home values, five of the top twenty "most miserable cities" were located in the San Joaquin Valley.  Aside from the collapse of median home values, persistent crime, unemployment and poverty were common factors between Bakersfield, Fresno, Merced, Modesto and Stockton; every major city of the San Joaquin Valley.

Response 
In response the University of California with the University of California, Merced is exploring opening a research medical school specializing in rural care, in hopes that some graduates will settle in the San Joaquin Valley and provide better healthcare

References

San Joaquin Valley
United States economic policy
Poverty in the United States
Economy of California